Queen Margaret University is a university, founded in 1875 and located in Edinburgh, Scotland. It is named after the Scottish Queen Saint Margaret.

History

The university was founded in 1875, as The Edinburgh School of Cookery and Domestic Economy, by Christian Guthrie Wright and Louisa Stevenson, both members of the Edinburgh Ladies' Educational Association.  The School was founded as a women-only institution, with twin aims of improving women's access to higher education and improving the diets of working class families. Teaching was initially delivered via lectures at the Royal Museum, supplemented by a programme of public lectures and demonstrations delivered nationwide, but in 1877 the School established a base at Shandwick Place, in Haymarket.

The school moved in 1891 to Atholl Crescent, expanding its courses and offering residential places to students.  In 1909, the School was designated a Central Institution and brought under the public control of the Scottish Education Department.  The first Principal appointed was Ethel De la Cour. De la Cour retired in 1930, and in the same year the School became the Edinburgh College of Domestic Science.

In 1961, the college acquired its Corstorphine campus, purchasing a portion of the Clermiston estate from developers.  The campus was first occupied by the college in 1970, opened by Princess Alice, Duchess of Gloucester who was patron of the institution until her death. In 1972, the name Queen Margaret was adopted to dissociate the college from the narrow field of domestic science. Thereafter, the college broadened its range of courses, especially in the dramatic arts and paramedical healthcare fields.  The following institutions have since been absorbed by Queen Margaret:

 The Edinburgh College of Speech and Drama (established 1929, joined 1971)
 The Edinburgh School of Speech Therapy (established 1946, joined 1975)
 The Royal Infirmary of Edinburgh School of Physiotherapy (established 1940, joined 1978)
 The Astley Ainslie Hospital Occupational Therapy Training Centre (established 1937, joined 1979)
 The Edinburgh Foot Clinic and School of Chiropody (established 1924, joined 1984)
 The Edinburgh School of Radiography (established 1936, joined 1992)
 The Edinburgh University Settlement School of Art Therapy (established 1992, joined 1997)

In 1992, the Privy Council granted Queen Margaret College powers to award its own taught degrees, and in 1998, the college was granted full degree powers, which enabled it to award its own research and higher degrees. As a result, in January 1999 the institution took the name Queen Margaret University College. After the University College attained the final criteria of acquiring a minimum of 5000 students (something that could not be gained earlier as the former campuses could not accommodate that number of students), the institution was awarded full university status, becoming Queen Margaret University, Edinburgh in January 2007.

In 2012, QMU became the first university in Scotland to have a Business Gateway on campus.

Scotland's First Minister, Alex Salmond announced in May 2010 that QMU was to be the official host of the archives for Homecoming Scotland 2009. The Homecoming Scotland Archive will collect, catalogue and preserve materials associated with Scottish Homecoming 2009.

Campuses

Former campuses
Before moving to a new campus just outside Musselburgh, Queen Margaret University had been based in campuses in Corstorphine (to the West of Edinburgh), in Leith, and at the Gateway Theatre – Scotland's International Drama Centre – (a former television studio previously owned by Scottish Television) on Elm Row, Leith Walk.

New Campus

In 2007–2008, the university brought together students from its three campuses in Edinburgh by moving to a new purpose-built campus near Musselburgh, East Lothian.

QMU has been "touted as the country's greenest University campus". The campus was designed by Dyer Architects to exceed current environmental standards and sets a new benchmark in sustainable design. The entire development transformed a  site from low-grade farmland into landscaped parkland.
The new campus was officially opened by Her Majesty the Queen on 4 July 2008.

In June 2015, Queen Margaret University, Edinburgh announced it would hold public consultations for plans to build a new innovation park and shopping hub on open land around the Musselburgh campus. Site proposals are being developed by CAM-SCI, a Cambridge-based economic consultancy, which has developed science parks across the UK.

Learning Resource Centre
Located at the heart of the campus, it provides library, IT and AV services to students, staff and visitors of the university. The LRC consists of a facility for both directed and self-directed study, based on an integrated library and information service provision. The LRC has 1,000 study spaces organised as a mixture of silent and group study areas, bookable group study rooms, training rooms, assistive technology, student learning support and a postgraduate study room.

Education Resource Centre
The Education Resource Centre provides audio-visual services to the university. This includes the provision of AV equipment in classrooms and lecture theatres as well as more specialised services such as graphics, photography, video-conferencing and TV studio facilities.

Organisation

School of Arts, Social Sciences and Management 

Following restructuring in early 2010, the Schools of Social Sciences, Media and Communication, Business, Enterprise and Management, and Drama and Creative Industries were merged. The present Dean is Professor David Stevenson.  The School offers courses in 'Business, Enterprise and Management', which contains the International Centre for the Study of Planned Events; 'Governance, Justice and Public Management'; 'Hospitality and Gastronomy'; Creativity and Culture'; and 'Public Relations' .

QMU was part of the Scottish Drama Training Network which was set up by the Scottish Funding Council in 2010 to foster cohesion across stage and screen professional practice, education and training. Through the Network, QMU in partnership with Edinburgh Napier University delivered the BA (Hons) Acting for Stage and Screen. Since the Training Network ceased QMU now offers its own acting and performance training programmes delivering the BA (Hons) Acting and Performance and BA (Hons) Performance along with its four year BA (Hons) Drama programme. It is also the only institution in Scotland offering a BA (Hons) in Theatre and Film as well as a Masters in Stage Management & Technical Theatre Production. It is also only one of three places in Scotland to offer a degree in Costume Design and Construction. In 2021/22 QMU celebrated 50 years of professional Drama training.

The School is the only institution in Scotland that is accredited by the Chartered Institute of Public Relations to deliver the postgraduate CIPR Diploma in Public Relations. The School's Bachelor of Science (BSc) courses in psychology; MSc in Health Psychology are accredited by the British Psychological Society.

BA (Hons) Film and Media graduate, Agata Jagodzinska, was awarded for Best Writer at the BAFTA in Scotland New Talent Awards.

In 2019 Queen Margaret University became a key player in the delivery of Initial Teacher Education in Scotland offering the BA (Hons) in Primary Education and a BA (Hons) in Education Studies along with an expanding postgraduate PGDE programme in Home Economics, Business Education and Religious, Moral and Philosophical Studies.

School of Health Sciences

The School of Health Sciences offers the widest range of professional healthcare courses of any university in Scotland. The present Dean is Professor Fiona Coutts. The School offers courses in dietetics, nutrition and biological sciences; nursing; paramedic science; speech and language therapy, audiology, occupational therapy and art therapy; physiotherapy; podiatry and radiography. Postgraduate courses are offered in (international) art psychotherapy, music therapy and dramatherapy: QMU is the only institution in Scotland offering these fully HCPC accredited therapy courses as a Master of Science (MSc).

The subject area of Speech and Hearing Sciences won the Queen's Anniversary Prize for research into the clinical applications of speech technology in 2002 carried out in the Speech Science Research Centre.

Governance
In October 2016, Dame Prue Leith DBE became Chancellor, succeeding Sir Tom Farmer.

Sir Paul Grice KBE assumed the role of Principal and Vice Chancellor in October 2019.  He was knighted in the New Year Honours List 2016 for services to the Scottish Parliament and services to higher education and the community in Scotland. Sir Paul was Chief Executive and Clerk of the Scottish Parliament prior to his appointment to Queen Margaret University succeeding Professor Petra Wend.

Professor Petra Wend CBE joined Queen Margaret University in September 2009. She originally read Italian and French Language and Literature, and Education at the University of Münster in Germany. Following a series of positions at UK universities, she joined Oxford Brookes University as Deputy Vice-Chancellor (Academic) and Deputy Chief Executive in 2005. She retired from her position in 2019.

Academic profile

Rankings and reputation

In June 2012 the management team at Queen Margaret University, Edinburgh, was presented with the Times Higher Education Leadership and Management Team Award.

QMU won the e-Government National Award 2010 in the category for sustainable, 'green IT' or 'carbon-efficient' services. In autumn 2010 it picked up gold at the Scottish Green Awards, and in 2009 it won an award for a waste management project, as well as a Green Apple Award.

Research

The university has three flagships: health and rehabilitation; creativity and culture; and sustainable business.

Queen Margaret University, Edinburgh, has seven research centres:

 Centre for Health, Activity and Rehabilitation Research
 Centre for Applied Social Sciences
 Centre for Person-centred Practice Research
 Clinical Audiology, Speech and Language Research Centre
 Institute for Global Health and Development
 Centre for Communication, Cultural and Media Studies
 Scottish Centre for Food Development and Innovation

The university operates an open access repository of the research output of the university, called eResearch, with the intention of making the work of researchers open and available to the public via the web.

Queen Margaret University, Edinburgh, researchers in food and drink in partnerships with Advanced Microwave Technologies Ltd (AMT), won two major awards for innovation and partnership in 2012 for their collaboration to explore the application of microwave technologies to the food and drink sector.

Notable alumni

See also
 Armorial of UK universities
 List of universities in the United Kingdom
 Universities in Scotland

References

External links

Queen Margaret University official website
Queen Margaret University Student' Union
Queen Margaret University open access research repository

 
1875 establishments in the United Kingdom
Education in East Lothian
Drama schools in Scotland
Musselburgh
Universities UK